The George W. Smith House is a historic house in Geneva, Nebraska. It was built in 1890 for George W. Smith, a real estate investor and former banker who lived in the house until 1921. Smith was married Addie F. Dempster, whose brother lived in the Dempster-Sloan House. In 1925, this house was turned into a hospital by a nurse named Anna Eggenberger. The hospital closed down in 1942, and it was later remodelled as a private residence. The house was designed in the Queen Anne architectural style. It has been listed on the National Register of Historic Places since May 8, 1986.

References

National Register of Historic Places in Fillmore County, Nebraska
Queen Anne architecture in Nebraska
Houses completed in 1890